Algés, Linda-a-Velha e Cruz Quebrada-Dafundo is a civil parish in the municipality of Oeiras, Portugal. It was formed in 2013 by the merger of the former parishes Algés, Linda-a-Velha and Cruz Quebrada-Dafundo. The population in 2011 was 48,665, in an area of 7.18 km².

References